The 1981 Trevira Cup was a men's tennis tournament played on indoor carpet courts in Frankfurt, West Germany that was part of the WCT category of the 1981 Volvo Grand Prix. It was the second edition of the tournament and was held from 30 March until 5 April 1981. First-seeded John McEnroe won the singles title.

Finals

Singles
 John McEnroe defeated  Tomáš Šmíd 6–2, 6–3
 It was McEnroe's 3rd singles title of the year and the 27th of his career.

Doubles
 Butch Walts /  Brian Teacher defeated  Vitas Gerulaitis /  John McEnroe 7–5, 6–7, 7–5
 It was Walts' 3rd doubles title of the year and the 11th of his career. It was Teacher's 2nd doubles title of the year and the 10th of his career.

References

External links
 ITF tournament edition details

Trevira Cup
Trevira Cup